William Henry Giles Kingston (28 February 1814 – 5 August 1880), often credited as W. H. G. Kingston, was an English writer of boys' adventure novels.

Life
William Henry Giles Kingston was born in Harley Street, London on 28 February 1814. He was the eldest son of Lucy Henry Kingston (d.1852) and his wife Frances Sophia Rooke (b.1789), daughter of Sir Giles Rooke, Judge of the Court of Common Pleas. Kingston's paternal grandfather John Kingston (1736–1820) was a Member of Parliament who staunchly supported the Abolition of the Slave Trade, despite having a plantation in Demerara. His father Lucy entered into the wine business in Oporto, and Kingston lived there for many years, making frequent voyages to England and developing a lifelong affection for the sea.

He was educated at Trinity College, Cambridge and afterwards entered his father's wine business, but soon indulged in his natural bent for writing. His newspaper articles on Portugal were translated into Portuguese, and assisted the conclusion of the commercial treaty with Portugal in 1842, when he received from Donna Maria da Gloria an order of Portuguese knighthood and a pension.

His first book was The Circassian Chief, a story published in 1844. While still living in Oporto, he wrote The Prime Minister, a historical novel based loosely on the life of Sebastião José de Carvalho e Melo, 1st Marquis of Pombal, and Lusitanian Sketches, descriptions of travels in Portugal. Settling in England, he interested himself in the emigration movement, edited The Colonist and The Colonial Magazine and East India Review in 1844, was honorary secretary of a colonisation society, wrote Some Suggestions for a System of General Emigration in 1848, lectured on colonisation in 1849, published a manual for colonists entitled How to Emigrate in 1850, and visited the western highlands on behalf of the emigration commissioners. He was afterwards a zealous volunteer and worked actively for the improvement of the condition of seamen. But from 1850, his chief occupation was writing books for boys, or editing boys' annuals and weekly periodicals. He started the Union Jack, a paper for boys, only a few months before his death. His stories number more than a hundred; the best known are:

 Peter the Whaler, 1851
 Blue Jackets, 1854
 Digby Heathcote, 1860
 The Cruise of the Frolic, 1860
 The Fireships, 1862
 The midshipman Marmaduke Merry, 1863
 Foxholme Hall, 1867
 Ben Burton, 1872
 The Three Midshipmen, 1873
 The Three Lieutenants, 1876
 The Three Commanders, 1876
 The Three Admirals, 1878
 Kidnapping in the Pacific, 1879
 Hendriks the Hunter, 1884

He travelled widely on the ordinary routes of travel, and described his experience for the young in:

 Western Wanderings. Or, a pleasure tour in the Canadas, 1856
 My Travels in Many Lands, 1862 (France, Italy and Portugal)
 "In The Eastern Seas", 1871
 The Western World, 1874
 A Yacht Voyage round England, 1879

His popular records of adventure and of discovery included:

 Captain Cook: His Life, Voyages, and Discoveries, 1871
 Great African Travellers, 1874
 Popular History of the Navy, 1876
 Notable Voyages from Columbus to Parry, 1880
 Adventures in the Far West, 1881
 Adventures in Africa, 1883
 Adventures in India, 1884
 Adventures in Australia, 1885
 Travels of Dr. Livingstone (also known as Livingstone's Travels), 1886
 Travels of Mungo Park, Denham and Clapperton, 1886

He published translations of several of Jules Verne's stories from the French (see below on the actual translator), and wrote many historical tales dealing with almost all periods and countries, from Eldol the Druid (1874) and Jovinian, a tale of Early Papal Rome (1877) downwards, and undertook some popular historical compilations such as Half-Hours with the Kings and Queens of England (1876).

He rewrote Richard Johnson's 1596 book The Seven Champions of Christendom to bring the language into more contemporary English.

His writings occupy nine pages and a half of the British Museum Catalogue. They were very popular; his tales were quite innocuous, but most of them proved ephemeral. Feeling his health failing, he wrote a farewell letter on 2 August 1880 in touching terms to the boys for whom he had written so much and so long, and died three days later at Stormont Lodge, Willesden, near London.

Family life

On 4 August 1853, Kingston married Agnes Kinloch, daughter of Captain Charles Kinloch of the 52nd Light Infantry who had served in the Peninsular War as aide-de-camp to General Sir John Hope. Their honeymoon was spent in Canada, where Kingston acquired the background for many of his later novels, and they spent their first Christmas at Quebec City with the family of William Collis Meredith, Chief Justice of Quebec. Agnes Kinloch was privately educated, as was the custom of the time. She sang well, was an accomplished musician, studied art and languages in Europe, and spoke both French and German fluently, a skill which was to be of benefit during her husband's later financial troubles. She bore her husband eight children but all died early, and this branch of the family is now extinct.

Kingston's brother George Kingston (1816–1886) was a Canadian professor, meteorologist, author, and public servant. He has been called the father of Canadian Meteorology for successfully promoting and organising one of Canada's first national scientific services.

Financial troubles and translations of Jules Verne

Beginning in 1860, Kingston suffered a number of financial reverses resulting from his publishing activities and, by 1868, he was very nearly bankrupt. In fact, he was forced to accept a grant of £50 from the Royal Literary Fund and, a few months later, £100 from the Queen's Civil List. The financial troubles continued and resulted in Kingston living as a recluse during the last ten years of his life.

Beginning in the 1870s, Kingston entered into a contract with publishers Sampson Low and Marston to translate some works of French author Jules Verne. These are the works for which Kingston is most remembered today. They were all published under his name, but the translations were actually done by his wife Agnes Kinloch Kingston. This fact was generally known in literary circles, and actually mentioned in Mrs. Kingston's obituary in 1913, but it was apparently forgotten until it was revived in the 20th Century edition of the Dictionary of National Biography in 2004. The Verne books which Mrs. Kingston translated are:

 The Mysterious Island, Sampson Low et al., 3 volumes: 1875, reprinted by Scribner, Armstrong, & Co., New York, 1 volume: 1876
 Michael Strogoff, Sampson Low et al.: 1876, reprinted by Scribner, Armstrong, & Co., "revised by Julius Chambers": 1877
 The Child of the Cavern; or Strange Doings Underground, Sampson Low et al.: 1877
 The Begum's Fortune; with an account of The Mutineers of the Bounty, Sampson Low et al.: 1879, reprinted by J. B. Lippincott: 1879

Kingston died at his family home at 3 Brondesbury Villas, Willesden, Middlesex on 5 August 1880, and his death was registered four days later by H. C. Kingston, "present at the death". The cause of death was cited on his death certificate as "Cancer of Kidney, Time not known, Certified by J. F. Anderson MD."

Popularity
His first book The Circassian Chief appeared in 1844. His first book for boys Peter the Whaler was published in 1851 and had such success that he retired from business and devoted himself entirely to the production of this kind of literature and, during 30 years, he wrote upwards of 130 tales, including:

The Three Midshipmen (1862),
The Three Lieutenants (1874),
The Three Commanders (1875),
The Three Admirals (1877),
Digby Heathcote, etc.

He also wrote a tale about the notorious outlaw Ninco Nanco called Ninco Nanco, The Neapolitan Brigand, from Foxholme Hall.

He also conducted various papers, including The Colonist and Colonial Magazine and East India Review. He was also interested in emigration, volunteering, and various philanthropic schemes. He received a Portuguese knighthood for services in negotiating a commercial treaty with Portugal, and a Government pension for his literary labours.

He is mentioned by Robert Louis Stevenson in the poem prefacing Treasure Island:

If studious youth no longer crave,
His ancient appetites forgot,
Kingston, or Ballantyne the brave,
Or Cooper of the wood and wave ...

References

External links

 
 
 
 List of  W.H.G. Kingston's books
 Frederick Morgan Collection at the University of Melbourne includes an almost complete set of Kingston's books

1814 births
1880 deaths
Alumni of Trinity College, Cambridge
Writers from London
French–English translators
19th-century British translators